Roumyana Slabakova (Bulgarian: Румяна Слабакова) is a linguist specializing in the theory of second language acquisition (SLA), particularly acquisition of semantics, and its practical implications for teaching and studying languages.

Early life and education 
Slabakova was born in Varna, Bulgaria, where she received her first degrees (B.A. and M.A.) from Sofia University "Kliment Ohridski" in English Philology There, she also specialized in linguistics of English as well as educational psychology. She spent some years teaching English as a second language in Varna in the period when Bulgaria was establishing itself as an independent county. After that, Slabakova embarked on her PhD project at McGill University where she was advised by Lydia White, a linguist who established generative second language acquisition as a separate field. She wrote her thesis on acquisition of aspect, synthesizing recent development in semantic and syntactic theories of aspect (among them, telicity). Slabakova conducted a number of experiments involving ESL learners in Varna to find out whether her results would support any of the theories of SLA which existed at the time. She published extensively on the topic of aspect in Slavic and Germanic languages and contributed to both SLA and syntax-semantics interface. Having graduated from McGill University, Slabakova took a position at University of Iowa where she remained for 15 years. Slabakova has mentioned that working with her colleague and mentor at Iowa, William Davies, has greatly influenced her demeanor and the way she pursues research.

Research 
Over her career, Slabakova worked on a wide range of topics: from purely semantic or purely syntactic ones to functional morphology. In fact, her prominent Bottleneck Hypothesis for second language acquisition posits that functional morphology is the most difficult part of acquisition process. In her 2008 book, working on the Bottleneck Hypothesis, Slabakova explores how learners make meaning from the newly acquired words and sentences.

Slabakova has also made notable contributions to the field of third language acquisition (TLA). She collaborated with Marit Westergaard in this field to investigate the accessibility of Universal Grammar in the acquisition process. In 2017, Slabakova proposed Scalpel Model which posed that the previous languages do play role in the transfer processes at the developmental stages of TLA. It has been pointed out that the Scalpel Model is an interdisciplinary one and draws heavily on neurobiology and experimental psychology in its predictive and descriptive power (unlike, for example, Flynn's CEM model).

Current contributions 
Slabakova has contributed to a number of peer-reviewed journals. She co-founded Linguistic Approaches to Bilingualism with her student Jason Rothman in 2010. Since then, Slabakova became co-editor of SLR, one of the top-tier journals in the SLA field. Lastly, she is a co-editor of Language Acquisition and Language Disorders series of John Bemjamins with her doctoral advisor Lydia White. As of March 2021, Roumyana Slabakova has over 10,100 citations on Google Scholar, and her h-index is 35. In 2020, she published a new textbook focusing on generativity in SLA. Slabakova holds an adjunct position as a professor at NTNU.

Selected bibliography 

 Montrul, Silvina, and Roumyana Slabakova. "Competence similarities between native and near-native speakers: An investigation of the preterite-imperfect contrast in Spanish." Studies in second language acquisition (2003): 351-398.
 Slabakova, Roumyana. "Is there a critical period for semantics?." Second Language Research 22.3 (2006): 302-338.
 Slabakova, Roumyana. "What is easy and what is hard to acquire in a second language." Contemporary approaches to second language acquisition 9.5 (2013).
 Slabakova, Roumyana, Paula Kempchinsky, and Jason Rothman. "Clitic-doubled left dislocation and focus fronting in L2 Spanish: A case of successful acquisition at the syntax–discourse interface." Second Language Research 28.3 (2012): 319-343.
 Slabakova, Roumyana. "Recent research on the acquisition of aspect: an embarrassment of riches?." Second Language Research 18.2 (2002): 172-188.
 Slabakova, Roumyana. "Semantic evidence for functional categories in interlanguage grammars." Second Language Research 19.1 (2003): 42-75.

References 

Living people
American women academics
British women academics
Members of the Norwegian Academy of Science and Letters
Year of birth missing (living people)
21st-century American women